Christine Adams may refer to:

Christine Adams (actress) (born 1974), English actress
Christine Adams (athlete) (born 1974), German athlete

See also 
 Chris Adams (disambiguation)